Leeds North West is a constituency in the City of Leeds which has been represented in the House of Commons of the UK Parliament since 2017 by Alex Sobel, of Labour Co-op.

Boundaries 

1950–1955: The County Borough of Leeds wards of Far Headingley, Hyde Park, and Kirkstall.

1955–1974: The County Borough of Leeds wards of Far Headingley, Hyde Park, Kirkstall, Meanwood, and Moortown.

1974–1983: The County Borough of Leeds wards of Cookridge, Headingley, Kirkstall, Moortown, and Weetwood.

1983–2010: The City of Leeds wards of Cookridge, Headingley, Otley and Wharfedale, and Weetwood.

2010–present: The City of Leeds wards of Adel and Wharfedale, Headingley, Otley and Yeadon, and Weetwood.

The constituency covers the north western part of the metropolitan borough of the City of Leeds, West Yorkshire.  It stretches from Yeadon in the north west and Otley in the north east to Headingley in the south in terms of major settlements.

History 
The constituency was created in 1950, as Leeds North-West; the name was changed by dropping the hyphen in 1955. Before the 1950 general election, Leeds was represented by the constituencies of: Leeds Central, Leeds North, Leeds South, Leeds West, (all created 1885); Leeds North-East and Leeds South-East (both created 1918).  There were also constituencies of Batley and Morley (created 1918) and Pudsey and Otley (created 1918 replacing Pudsey). Leeds North West was created before the 1950 election, and at the same time the Pudsey and Otley constituency was abolished, re-creating the Pudsey constituency and moving Otley into the Ripon constituency. The Leeds North West boundary was revised prior to the 1983 general election, bringing in Otley and the nearby villages of Bramhope, Pool-in-Wharfedale and Arthington from the abolition of the Ripon constituency.

The constituency was held for the Conservative Party by Donald Kaberry from its creation in 1950 until his retirement in 1983, and then by Keith Hampson (1983–1997), who had previously been MP for Ripon.  It was taken for Labour in the 1997 general election by Harold Best, who was re-elected in the 2001 general election.  Best retired at the 2005 general election.  The seat was contested for Labour by Judith Blake (at that time Deputy Leader of the Labour Group on Leeds City Council, and later also Labour's candidate in the 2010 general election), but it was taken for the Liberal Democrats by Greg Mulholland. Mulholland was re-elected in 2010 and 2015. Alex Sobel regained the seat for Labour in the 2017 general election.

Constituency profile
This constituency has one of the biggest student populations in the country at over a quarter of the electorate; it comprises outer Leeds suburbs that are professional, middle-to-high income and residential.

Members of Parliament

Elections

Elections in the 2010s

Elections in the 2000s

Elections in the 1990s

Elections in the 1980s

Elections in the 1970s

Elections in the 1960s

Elections in the 1950s

See also 
 List of parliamentary constituencies in West Yorkshire

Notes

References

Parliamentary constituencies in Yorkshire and the Humber
Constituencies of the Parliament of the United Kingdom established in 1950
Politics of Leeds